Il ladrone (internationally released as The Good Thief and The Thief) is a 1980 Italian comedy film written and directed by Pasquale Festa Campanile.

For his performance in this film and in Aragosta a colazione, Enrico Montesano was awarded with a Special David di Donatello.

Plot 
In Palestine, the thief Caleb deceives his victims with fake miracles, and the man gets very upset when he learns that a young man by the name of Christ, the Messiah, performs real miracles, healing people and raising the dead. Caleb is jailed by the Romans. He will die along with the Messiah.

Cast 
 Enrico Montesano: Caleb
 Edwige Fenech: Deborah 
 Bernadette Lafont: Appula 
 Claudio Cassinelli: Jesus
 Susanna Martinková  
 Sara Franchetti
 Auretta Gay

References

External links

1980 films
Commedia all'italiana
Films directed by Pasquale Festa Campanile
Italian comedy films
Films scored by Ennio Morricone
1980 comedy films
Films set in the Roman Empire
Films set in the 1st century
1980s Italian films